Bonari is a village in Kohgiluyeh and Boyer-Ahmad Province, Iran.

Bonari or Banari or Benari may also refer to:
 Bonari-ye Fathi
 Bonari-ye Olya
 Bonari-ye Sofla
 Banari, Zanjan